XHAAA-FM (branded as La Caliente) is a Regional Mexican radio station that serves the Reynosa, Tamaulipas/McAllen, Texas border area. It broadcasts from the Multimedios tower at El Control, Tamaulipas, between Reynosa and Matamoros.

History
XHAAA received its concession on November 22, 1979. The original concession holder was Francisco González Sánchez, the current president of Grupo Multimedios.

External links

 mmradio.com

References

Regional Mexican radio stations
Radio stations in Reynosa
Multimedios Radio